Deborah Iona Raffin (March 13, 1953 – November 21, 2012) was an American actress, model and audiobook publisher.

Early life 
Raffin was born in Los Angeles, California, to actress Trudy Marshall and Phillip Jordan Raffin, a restaurateur and business executive. Her father was Jewish, and her mother was from a Christian background; Raffin identified with Judaism.

Career
Like her mother, Raffin appeared as a model on numerous magazine covers including 'Teen, Seventeen and Good Housekeeping in the 1970s and 1980s and acted in several 1970s Hollywood films. She co-starred with Joseph Bottoms in the Gregory Peck-produced film The Dove (1974). Her 1976 television movie, Nightmare in Badham County, became a theatrical hit in mainland China, making Raffin a star there and leading to her later becoming the first Western actress ever to undertake a movie promotion tour in that country. She was nominated for both a Golden Globe Award for Best Actress and a Razzie Award for Worst Actress for her performance in Touched by Love in 1981. That same year, she starred in the TV series adaptation of the hit 1978 film Foul Play, in which she and Barry Bostwick took over the roles played by Goldie Hawn and Chevy Chase.

In 1988, she starred in James Clavell's Noble House with Pierce Brosnan. In 1991, she appeared as Julie Vale, a telepath, in the cult film Scanners II: The New Order alongside actor David Hewlett. She later appeared as Julie Camden Hastings on the television show 7th Heaven and as Dr. Hightower in the ABC Family teenager series The Secret Life of the American Teenager.

Personal life
Raffin married film producer Michael Viner in 1974. The couple later became audiobook publishers. They had one child, daughter Taylor, and divorced in 2005.

Death 
Raffin was diagnosed with blood cancer in 2011. On November 21, 2012, she died from leukemia at the Ronald Reagan UCLA Medical Center in Los Angeles, California. She was 59 years old. She was buried at the Hillside Memorial Park Cemetery in Culver City, California.

Select filmography 

 40 Carats (1973) as Trina Stanley
 The Dove (1974) as Patti Ratteree
 Jacqueline Susann's Once Is Not Enough (1975) as January Wayne
 God Told Me To (1976) as Casey Forster
 Nightmare in Badham County (1976, TV movie)
 The Sentinel (1977) as Jennifer
 The Ransom (aka Assault on Paradise) (1977) as Cindy Simmons
 Mind Over Murder (1979, TV movie) as Suzy
 The Last Convertible (1979, TV miniseries, 2 episodes)
 Touched by Love (1980) as Lena Canada
 Killing at Hell’s Gate (1981, TV movie) as Anna Medley
 For Lovers Only (1982) as Lilah Ward
 Dance of the Dwarfs (1983) as Dr. Evelyn Howard
 Grizzly II: Revenge (1983) as Samantha Owens
 Sparkling Cyanide (1983, TV movie) as Iris Murdoch
 Lace II (1984, TV miniseries, 3 episodes) as Judy Hale
 Last Video and Testament episode from Hammer House of Mystery and Suspense (1984, series) as Selena Frankham
 Death Wish 3 (1985) as Kathryn Davis
 Claudia (1985) as Claudia
 Noble House (1988, TV miniseries, 2 episodes) as Casey Tcholok
 B.L. Stryker (1989, episode "Carolann") as Carolann
 Night of the Fox (1990) as Sarah Drayton
 Morning Glory (1993) as Elly Dinsmore (also co-writer of screenplay)

References

External links
 
 

1953 births
2012 deaths
20th-century American actresses
20th-century American Jews
21st-century American Jews
21st-century American women
Actresses from Los Angeles
American film actresses
American television actresses
American television directors
American women film directors
Burials at Hillside Memorial Park Cemetery
Deaths from cancer in California
Deaths from leukemia
Film directors from California
Jewish American actresses
American women television directors